Shipton-on-Cherwell and Whitehill Farm Quarries is a  geological Site of Special Scientific Interest north of Kidlington in Oxfordshire. It is a Geological Conservation Review site.

This site exposes a lithostratigraphic succession dating to the Bathonian stage of the Middle Jurassic, around 167 million years ago. Shipton-on-Cherwell Quarry  is described by Natural England as "of international importance as one of the best Upper Bathonian reptile sites known", and it has yielded type material for two species of crocodile. The quarry has also produced the type specimen of the dinosaur Dacentrurus vetustus.

The site is private land with no public access.

References

Sites of Special Scientific Interest in Oxfordshire
Geological Conservation Review sites